KRI Ardadedali (404) is a submarine of the Indonesian Navy.

Specifications
Its has a peak speed of  when submerged and  surfaced. The vessel is powered by 4 MTU 12V 493 diesel generators. Its carries a crew of up to 40, and is equipped with 533 mm torpedo tubes. Submarines of the Nagapasa class also possess ZOKA acoustic torpedo countermeasures manufactured by Turkish company ASELSAN.

Service history
The ship was ordered on 21 December 2011 as part of a US$ 1.07 billion contract between Indonesia and South Korea to provide three submarines, with Daewoo Shipbuilding & Marine Engineering (DSME) being awarded the contract. As part of the deal, two of the submarines (Nagapasa and Ardadedali) were constructed in South Korea, while the third one (Alugoro) was constructed in PT PAL's shipyard in Surabaya as part of a technology transfer program. Ardedali'''s keel was laid in 2014 and she was launched on 24 October 2016.Ardadedali was delivered and commissioned in a ceremony at DSME's shipyard in Okpo, Geoje on 25 April 2018, before sailing to its base in Surabaya. She was attached to the Indonesian Navy's 2nd Fleet Command, based in Surabaya. Her name Ardadedali'' was based on an arrow in the possession of Arjuna in the Mahabharata epic.

References

Attack submarines
Submarines of Indonesia
Jang Bogo-class submarines
2016 ships